Eurydike (minor planet designation: 75 Eurydike) is a large main-belt asteroid. It has an M-type spectrum and a relatively high albedo and may be rich in nickel-iron. Eurydike was discovered by German-American astronomer C. H. F. Peters on September 22, 1862. It was second of his numerous asteroid discoveries and is named after Eurydice, the wife of Orpheus. The asteroid is orbiting the Sun for a period of 4.37 years and completes a rotation about its axis every 5.4 hours.

References

External links
 
 

Background asteroids
Eurydike
Eurydike
M-type asteroids (Tholen)
Xk-type asteroids (SMASS)
18620922